= The Dirty Hearts =

The Dirty Hearts were a punk rock and garage rock duo from Austin, Texas. Its members were Frankie Medina, the band's frontman and guitarist, and Calida, the band's keyboardist. Their eponymous debut album was released in 2006 on Salt Shaker Records. It was followed by their second album, Pigs, which was released in 2008 on both Salt Shaker Records and Socyermom Records. The band released the song "Record Store" as a single from Pigs, along with an accompanying music video, which was directed by Jose Jones.

== Discography ==
- The Dirty Hearts (Salt Shaker, 2006)
- Pigs (Salt Shaker/Socyermom, 2008)
